Anna Cornelia Holt (1671–1692), was a late 17th-century painter from the Northern Netherlands.

Biography
She was born in Zwolle as the daughter of Herman Holt (1643–1672), councilman of Zwolle, and Armarenta Holt (d. 1714). She was the distant cousin of Aleida Greve and Sophia Holt. Along with her cousins, she became a pupil of the painter Wilhelmus Beurs. She was the youngest of Beurs' four pupils. Her father was Sophia's brother. The four pupils of Beurs were honored with a dedication page in his book that he published in 1692. Her self portrait with fruit looks very similar to the self-portrait created by her cousin Aleida Greve, who was the same age.
She died relatively young; no marriage is known.

References

 De groote waereld in 't kleen geschildert, of schilderagtigtafereel van 's weerelds schilderyen, kortelijk vervat in sesboeken, verklarende de hooftverwen, haare verscheidemengelingen in oly, en der zelver gebruik, by Wilhelmus Beurs, 1692, Amsterdam
 Vrouwen En Kunst in de Republiek: Een Overzicht, p. 55, by Els Kloek, Catherine Peters Sengers, Esther Tobé, 1998, Hilversum, 

1671 births
1692 deaths
Dutch Golden Age painters
People from Zwolle
Dutch women painters
17th-century women artists